Robert Don Hunter Dougan is an Australian composer, known for his genre-blending music. Mixing elements of orchestral music, trip hop, and bluesy vocals, his work is tangentially relatable to electronic music. He is known primarily for his breakthrough 1995 single "Clubbed to Death (Kurayamino Variation)", further popularised by 1999's The Matrix soundtrack. "Clubbed to Death" was re-released on his debut album Furious Angels in 2002, seven years after its initial release, as well as providing several variations of the song, most notably the Kurayamino variation; he has also provided a variation of the Moby song "Porcelain". In 1995, he teamed up with Rollo Armstrong to remix the U2 song "Numb"; the remix was titled "Numb (Gimme Some More Dignity Mix)".

Early life and education
Dougan was born in Melbourne, Australia in 1969 and raised in Sydney. He attended Saint Ignatius' College, Riverview, and then the National Institute of Dramatic Art, where he studied acting. In 1990, he travelled to London, and began to work in music with his friend Rollo, both of whom had worked together and released material in Australia.

Career
From 1991 to 1995, Dougan was a producer and remix artist. In 1994, his remixes started charting in the United Kingdom. He also released his first single, "Hard Times".

In 1995, his hit single "Clubbed to Death" gave him a recognised name in the UK dance club scene. He produced half a dozen remixes of it, including the "Kurayamino Variation". His label Mo' Wax Records was pleased and commissioned the follow-up, "Clubbed to Death 2" (later the bonus track on the album). CTD2 was never released as a single, but appeared on the James Lavelle disc of the 1996 DJ mix compilation album, Cream Live 2.

"Furious Angels" was not released on Mo' Wax, but Dougan eventually released it as a single in 1998 on Rollo's label Cheeky Records. Dougan worked for the following six years, doing remixes and licensing his tracks, in order to self-produce the album, which was backed by a full orchestra and a full choir. "Furious Angels" also featured as the musical score accompanying the introduction sequence for the 2000 racing simulation game Grand Prix 3.

In 1999, his exposure increased dramatically when his "Clubbed to Death (Kurayamino Variation)" was featured on the soundtrack of The Matrix. He contributed two more tracks to the soundtrack of 2003's Matrix sequel The Matrix Reloaded, "Château" and "Kung Fu" (a shortened version of "Furious Angels" made for The Matrix Reloaded). "I'm Not Driving Anymore (instrumental)" was also used for the trailer of the film and as background music for the DVD menu.

In 2002 in the UK, and 2003 in the rest of the world, Dougan released his debut album Furious Angels, which was met with "Generally favorable" reviews from critics. Later in 2003, a two-disc re-release of Furious Angels featured all-instrumental versions on the second disc. 

In 2006, Dougan was reportedly writing "a couple of songs" for Sugababes (for whom he produced the single "Too Lost in You"), and working on two albums of his own — one original, one classical.

A short film made for jewelry designer Solange Azagury-Partridge, The Letter, directed by Laurence Dunmore and starring Thandie Newton and Jason Isaacs features new music by Rob Dougan; the short film, however, does not mention the title of the song.

In May 2015, Dougan released The 22nd Sunday in Ordinary Time Sessions on his official site. The EP, recorded at London's Air Lyndhurst Studios with a 75-piece orchestra and 40-piece choir, consists of five instrumental songs and a 20-minute film of the sessions.

In October 2016, Dougan released Misc. Sessions EP on his official site. The EP, recorded at Abbey Road Studios with a 10-piece and 50-piece string section, consists of five tracks, with orchestra and instrumental mixes and an 18-minute film.

In 2018 Dougan compiled and released Films: Past and Future his first solely instrumental release, comprising 21 tracks available for the first time on vinyl, CD and digital download. The album was released via direct-to-fan company PledgeMusic just at the time that the organisation announced it was experiencing issues and had failed to pay many artistes the monies that had been pledged to them. In a personal project update posted on 18 February, Rob confirmed that he had been affected by the issues but, having already released the album digitally, had met the costs of physical releases himself, with the CD, vinyl and accompanying book due for release on 4 March 2019.

In February 2019, Dougan released The Life of the World to Come, a brand new four track EP which includes "The Life of the World to Come", "Beautiful Things", "Quasimodo's Dream" and "And Then I Think of You". Each song was released with an accompanying instrumental version and two of the tracks were cover versions - "Beautiful Things" written by Leslie Bricusse and "Quasimodo's Dream" by The Reels. The EP is published by Engard Ltd and was released by Dougan himself via Gumroad.

Non-musical activities 
In 2004, Dougan founded a vineyard called La Pèira in the Terrasses du Larzac region of France.

Discography

Albums

Studio albums

Compilation albums

Extended plays

Singles

Notes 

A  Furious Angels was not released in the United States until May 2003, where it was released on the record labels Warner Bros. Records and Reprise Records.
B  "Clubbed to Death" only charted in the UK and Ireland after being re-released in 2002.

See also
 The Matrix (franchise)
 The Matrix
 The Matrix Reloaded
 The Matrix Revolutions

References

External links
 www.robdougan.org — Rob Dougan fan site
 IGN's 2003 interview — All about his involvement with The Matrix franchise's soundtracks.
 

1969 births
Australian electronic musicians
Australian expatriates in England
Australian male composers
Australian male singers
Australian songwriters
Living people
Musicians from Melbourne
People educated at Saint Ignatius' College, Riverview
Reprise Records artists
Trip hop musicians
Warner Records artists